Järtsaare is a village in Kolga-Jaani Parish, Viljandi County, in central Estonia. According to Estonia Census 2000, the village had a population of 87.

The northeastern half of the village territory is covered by Soosaare Bog.

References

Villages in Viljandi County
Kreis Fellin